Sơn Bình may refer to several rural communes in Vietnam:

Sơn Bình, Bà Rịa–Vũng Tàu, a commune of Châu Đức District
Sơn Bình, Hà Tĩnh, a commune of Hương Sơn District
Sơn Bình, Kiên Giang, a commune of Hòn Đất District